Ettore Mambretti (1859–1948) was an Italian general. He commanded the 6th Army during the Battle of Mount Ortigara.

Biography
He attended the Military Academy of Modena, from which he came second lieutenant of the Bersaglieri in 1877. He remained in the Bersaglieri until his appointment as general. He took part in the Battle of Adua, which ended in an Italian defeat. Despite this,  he earned the silver medal for Military Valor. Later, in 1912, he was in Libya where, as soon as he arrived, he directed the Battle of Sidi Garabaa, also in an Italian defeat.

Mambretti was a commander general during the First World War, his name is remembered  for the Battle of Mount Ortigara, which led to the death of thousands of soldiers and his removal from command, since among other things he had also achieved many defeats in previous clashes. A particular fact, also testified by letters from Angelo Gatti and Luigi Cadorna, was the prejudice that Mambretti was a bringer of bad luck.

In a letter from General Cadorna it read: "The jetting wanted to be practiced to the extreme. The Austrians, after a great preparation of artillery, attacked and took the Ortigara from us, despite a strenuous defense. [...] when the soldiers see Mambretti they do the spells. In Italy, unfortunately, this prejudice constitutes a great opposing force". The defeat suffered on Ortigara and above all the great loss of men despite the abundance of means forced General Cadorna to remove Mambretti from his post.

After World War I, he nevertheless received promotion to army general on 31 December 1923 and in 1929 he was appointed Senator of the Kingdom of Italy, a position for which he himself had applied; in 1931 he was retired by the army. Mambretti died in 1948 in Rome.

References

External links
Mambretti on Senators of Italy, Senate of the Republic
 The Battle of Ortigara

1859 births
1948 deaths
Italian generals
Grand Officers of the Military Order of Savoy
Italian military personnel of World War I
Italian military personnel of the First Italo-Ethiopian War
Members of the Senate of the Kingdom of Italy
20th-century Italian politicians
Italian military personnel of the Italo-Turkish War